Servomechanisms, Inc., was a Cold war era U.S. defense sub-contractor, which developed precision sub-systems for high performance jet aircraft, guided missiles and ballistic missiles. Most widely publicised was the company's role in development of the Army Redstone missile under the auspices of the Army Ballistic Missile Agency. 95% of the company's business was military-related. Company headquarters as well as its main production lines were located at 12500 Aviation Blvd., Hawthorne, California. In 1964, Teledyne Industries, Inc. purchased Servomechanisms, Inc., which became Teledyne Systems Company, Controls Systems Division, having its office relocated at 200 North Aviation Blvd., El Segundo, California.

Structure 
The company had several divisions, two of which were located at the West Coast of the United States, while three others at the East Coast, particularly
 Goleta, California
 Research Division
 Hawthorne, California
 Western Division
 Mechaponents Division
 Westbury, Long Island
 Eastern Division  
 Mechatrol Division

References

Links 
 Servomechanisms, Inc. corporate data
 Servomechanisms, Inc. advertisement - Analytical Chemistry (ACS Publications)

Engineering companies of the United States
Teledyne Technologies